The Negritos Islands Biological Reserve is a nature reserve of Costa Rica, part of the Tempisque Conservation Area, containing two islands separated by a small channel in the Gulf of Nicoya which protects migratory bird species which use the island seasonally.

References

Nature reserves in Costa Rica
Geography of Guanacaste Province
1982 establishments in Costa Rica
Protected areas established in 1982